Blake Pope (born April 11, 2003) is an American soccer player who plays as a midfielder for MLS Next Pro club Portland Timbers 2.

Career
Born in Prosper, Texas, Pope began his career in the youth academy of D.C. United before joining the FC Dallas system in 2016. In 2019, Pope joined the Charlotte Independence youth academy. In 2021, it was announced that Pope had committed to playing college soccer for the Charlotte 49ers. Pope later de-committed from playing at UNC Charlotte.

On April 29, 2021, Pope signed an academy deal with the Charlotte Independence, allowing him to play matches in the USL Championship while maintaining his NCAA eligibility. He made his senior debut for the club on May 1 against the Tampa Bay Rowdies, coming on as a 78th minute substitute in a 3–0 defeat.

On March 4, 2022, Pope signed with MLS Next Pro club North Texas SC ahead of their 2022 season.

Career statistics

References

External links
 Profile at Charlotte Independence

2003 births
Living people
Sportspeople from Texas
American soccer players
Association football midfielders
Charlotte Independence players
North Texas SC players
USL Championship players
Soccer players from Texas
MLS Next Pro players
Portland Timbers 2 players